Samuel Cartwright FRS (1789 – 10 June 1864) was a British dentist.

Life
Cartwright, the son of Thomas Cartwright and his wife Catherine (née Bentley) was born in High Holborn, on 7 September 1788.  The Oxford Dictionary of National Biography erroneously gives his birthplace and date as Northampton in 1789, and, perhaps correctly, states that he was originally an ivory turner. The ODNB claim that "he came to London at an early age, wholly dependent upon his own exertions for his daily support", should be treated with a pinch of salt.  He started his career as a mechanical assistant to Charles Dumergue of Piccadilly, dentist to George IV. He demonstrated his skills as an ivory turner constructing dentures.

During this service he found time to give a regular attendance on anatomical and surgical lectures. In 1811 he started in practice on his own account at 32 Old Burlington Street, and soon acquired a reputation second to that of none, either before or since, who have practised the same branch of the healing art. He was as remarkable for the correctness and rapidity of his judgment as he was for marvellous dexterity in all manipulatory processes. During a great part of his career he was in the habit of seeing from forty to fifty patients every day, and this for months together, standing constantly from seven o'clock in the morning until the same hour in the evening, and yet in every case doing what he had to do without the slightest appearance of hurry or fatigue.

He did much to improve and elevate his profession, and is said for some years to have been in the receipt of an income of upwards of £10,000. He became a fellow of the Linnean Society on 19 Nov. 1833, a Fellow of the Royal Society on 11 Feb. 1841, and was also a fellow of the Geological Society, but never found time to make any contributions to the Proceedings of these institutions. His pleasing manners, liberal hospitality, and professional fame acquired for him the friendship of nearly all the most distinguished in science, literature, and art of his day.

He continued in practice at Old Burlington Street until 1857, when he retired, and in the following year had an apoplectic seizure which resulted in palsy, under which he laboured for the rest of his life.

He died at his residence, Nizell's House, near Tonbridge, on 10 June 1864.

Obituaries
Obituaries of Samuel Cartwright appeared in the British Journal of Dental Science and the Dental Review.

References

Attribution

1789 births
1864 deaths
People from Northampton
English dentists
Fellows of the Linnean Society of London
Fellows of the Royal Society
19th-century dentists